The 2023 North Texas SC season is the club's fifth season. The first three seasons North Texas SC competed in USL League One, including their championship year in the inaugural 2019 season. In December 2021, North Texas SC announced that they would compete in the inaugural MLS Next Pro season, a new division three league in American soccer.

Staff

Players

Transfers

In

Loan In

Out

Loan out

Non-competitive fixtures

Preseason

Competitive fixtures

MLS Next Pro Regular Season

MLS Next Pro play-offs

Statistics 

Numbers after plus-sign(+) denote appearances as a substitute.

Appearances and goals

Top scorers
{| class="wikitable" style="font-size: 95%; text-align: center;"
|-
!width=30|Rank
!width=30|Position
!width=30|Number
!width=175|Name
!width=75|
!width=75|
!width=75|Total
|-
|1
|
|
|align="left"|
|0
|0
|0
|-
!colspan="4"|Total
! 0
! 0
! 0
|-

Top assists
{| class="wikitable" style="font-size: 95%; text-align: center;"
|-
!width=30|Rank
!width=30|Position
!width=30|Number
!width=175|Name
!width=75|
!width=75|
!width=75|Total
|-
|1
|
|
|align="left"|
|0
|0
|0
|-
!colspan="4"|Total
! 0
! 0
! 0
|-

Disciplinary record
{| class="wikitable" style="text-align:center;"
|-
| rowspan="2" !width=15|
| rowspan="2" !width=15|
| rowspan="2" !width=120|Player
| colspan="3"|MLS Next Pro
| colspan="3"|MLSNP Playoffs
| colspan="3"|Total
|-
!width=34; background:#fe9;|
!width=34; background:#fe9;|
!width=34; background:#ff8888;|
!width=34; background:#fe9;|
!width=34; background:#fe9;|
!width=34; background:#ff8888;|
!width=34; background:#fe9;|
!width=34; background:#fe9;|
!width=34; background:#ff8888;|
|-
|7
|MF
|align="left"| Bernard Kamungo
|0||0||0||0||0||0||0||0||0
|-
|9
|MF
|align="left"| José Mulato
|0||0||0||0||0||0||0||0||0
|-
|10
|FW
|align="left"| Hope Avayevu
|0||0||0||0||0||0||0||0||0
|-
|11
|MF
|align="left"| Andre Costa
|0||0||0||0||0||0||0||0||0
|-
|13
|GK
|align="left"| Antonio Carrera
|0||0||0||0||0||0||0||0||0
|-
|15
|DF
|align="left"| Isaiah Parker
|0||0||0||0||0||0||0||0||0
|-
|16
|MF
|align="left"| Carl Fred Sainté
|0||0||0||0||0||0||0||0||0
|-
|18
|DF
|align="left"| Derek Waldeck
|0||0||0||0||0||0||0||0||0
|-
|20
|DF
|align="left"| Alejandro Araneda
|0||0||0||0||0||0||0||0||0
|-
|22
|FW
|align="left"| Pablo Torre
|0||0||0||0||0||0||0||0||0
|-
|25
|DF
|align="left"| Collin Smith
|0||0||0||0||0||0||0||0||0
|-
|26
|DF
|align="left"| Lucas Bartlett
|0||0||0||0||0||0||0||0||0
|-
|30
|GK
|align="left"| Seth Wilson
|0||0||0||0||0||0||0||0||0
|-
|42
|DF
|align="left"| Nolan Norris
|0||0||0||0||0||0||0||0||0
|-
|43
|DF
|align="left"| Tarik Scott
|0||0||0||0||0||0||0||0||0
|-
|45
|DF
|align="left"| Will Baker
|0||0||0||0||0||0||0||0||0
|-
|47
|MF
|align="left"| Jared Aguilar
|0||0||0||0||0||0||0||0||0
|-
|51
|MF
|align="left"| Malachi Molina
|0||0||0||0||0||0||0||0||0
|-
|52
|GK
|align="left"| Fabian Enriquez
|0||0||0||0||0||0||0||0||0
|-
|53
|MF
|align="left"| Alejandro Urzua
|0||0||0||0||0||0||0||0||0
|-
|60
|GK
|align="left"| Elliot Finley
|0||0||0||0||0||0||0||0||0
|-
|61
|MF
|align="left"| Michael Morales
|0||0||0||0||0||0||0||0||0
|-
|65
|MF
|align="left"| Dylan Lacy
|0||0||0||0||0||0||0||0||0
|-
|68
|MF
|align="left"| Santiago Ferreira
|0||0||0||0||0||0||0||0||0
|-
|
|DF
|align="left"| Yeicar Perlaza
|0||0||0||0||0||0||0||0||0
|-
|
|DF
|align="left"| Manuel Caicedo
|0||0||0||0||0||0||0||0||0
|-
|
|DF
|align="left"| Tyshawn Rose
|0||0||0||0||0||0||0||0||0
|-
|
|DF
|align="left"| Henri Santos
|0||0||0||0||0||0||0||0||0
|-
|
|MF
|align="left"| Diego Garcia
|0||0||0||0||0||0||0||0||0
|-
|
|MF
|align="left"| Alejandro Urzua
|0||0||0||0||0||0||0||0||0
|-
|
|MF
|align="left"| Tomas Pondeca
|0||0||0||0||0||0||0||0||0
|-
|colspan="3"|Total||0||0||0||0||0||0||0||0||0

References 

 

North Texas SC seasons
North Texas SC
North Texas SC
North Texas SC